Shalimar Gardens may refer to the following Mughal gardens:
Shalimar Bagh, Srinagar, India
Shalimar Gardens, Delhi, India
Shalimar Gardens, Lahore, Pakistan